State Road 203 is a 14-mile north–south highway in the U.S. state of Indiana that runs mostly in Scott County.

Route description
At the south end, State Road 203 begins just within Clark County at State Road 362 and passes north through the town of Lexington. It is concurrent with both State Road 3 and State Road 56 east of Scottsburg, and then continues north to State Road 256 near New Frankfort.

History
In September 2012, the section of SR 203 in Clark County was decommissioned.

Major intersections

References

External links

203
Transportation in Clark County, Indiana
Transportation in Scott County, Indiana